Peridroma cinctipennis is a moth of the family Noctuidae. It was first described by Arthur Gardiner Butler in 1881. It is endemic to the Hawaiian islands of Kauai, Oahu, Molokai, Maui and Hawaii.

The larvae feed on Aleurites moluccanus, Cheirodendron, various grasses, Lythrum, mango, Metrosideros, Pittosporum, Sonchus and Wikstroemia species.

Subspecies
Peridroma cinctipennis cinctipennis (Kauai, Oahu, Molokai, Maui, Hawaii)
Peridroma cinctipennis albistigma (Warren, 1912) (Oahu)

External links

Noctuinae
Endemic moths of Hawaii
Moths described in 1881